The On My Way Home Tour was the fourth headlining concert tour by American a cappella group Pentatonix to promote their EP PTX, Vol. III. The tour began on February 25, 2015, in Oakland, California, at the Fox Oakland Theatre, concluding on June 16, 2015, in Osaka, Japan, at Zepp Namba.

Background and development
On December 7, 2014, Pentatonix announced the On My Way Home Tour.
On April 1, 2016, a documentary of the tour was released on DVD.

Set list
This set list is representative of the show on February 25, 2015 in Oakland, California. It is not representative of all concerts for the duration of the tour.

"Problem" (Ariana Grande cover)
"Evolution of Beyoncé"
"Telephone" (Lady Gaga cover)
"La La Latch" (Naughty Boy and Disclosure mashup)
"Love You Long Time" (Jazmine Sullivan cover)
"Rather Be" (Clean Bandit cover)
"Julie-O" (Mark Summer cello cover from Kevin)
"Papaoutai" (Stromae cover)
"Aha!" (Imogen Heap cover)
"FourFiveSeconds" (Rihanna, Kanye West & Paul McCartney cover)
"Break Free" (Ariana Grande cover) / "See Through"
"Uptown Funk" (Mark Ronson & Bruno Mars cover)
"Let's Get It On" (Marvin Gaye cover)
"Evolution of Music"
"Standing By"
"On My Way Home"
Encore
"That's Christmas To Me"
"Daft Punk"

Tour dates

Notes
 Pentatonix member Kirstie was sick for part of this tour.

References

2015 concert tours
Pentatonix concert tours